Lundazi is a town in eastern Zambia, lying near the border with Malawi, around  from Chipata. Lundazi is known as a "Boma" or administrative centre (boma derives from the Swahili word for a thorn fence, built to protect livestock or travelers' camps). It was a former colonial headquarters. Lundazi is the District Capital — or "county seat" — for Lundazi District, which is the central portion of Eastern Zambia. It is perched high above the eastern side of the Luangwa Valley, and close to a quiet border crossing (the Mqocha/Mtyocha Border) to Malawi.

It has an airstrip, schools and a hotel in the form of a Norman castle. The building of the castle was begun in 1948 by the Kenyan born District Commissioner Errol Lancelot Button (1913-1991), who reputedly sketched out its design on the back of a cigarette packet. The castle overlooked a swamp where the Lundazi and Msuzi Rivers met, which Button dammed using soil carried to the site in grass baskets. The dam now supplies Lundazi's water and used to be home to several hippos.

The town also has a district hospital, a post office, two banks, two filling stations, a market, and some small shops. Lundazi Town is small and one can easily walk from one end of town to the other.

Lundazi's local political system is made up of 25 wards and 11 chiefdoms. Each ward is represented by an elected councillor and the 11 chiefdoms by two representative councillors in the Lundazi District Council.

The spoken language is Tumbuka.  The main source of income is agriculture and trading. Most of the traders are Zambians of Asian origin. Lundazi has a popular name 'Box One Kanele' (apparently a corruption of 'Colonel').

The town is the District Capital for Lundazi District, the central portion of Eastern Province.

References

External links 
 Africa 40 years on:Return to Lundazi, The Economist, Dec 20th 2005
 Blog with photographs

Populated places in Eastern Province, Zambia